Handpresso SARL is a French manufacturer of portable espresso machines. Founded in Fontainebleau in 2006 by Henrik Nielsen as a spin-off from Nielsen Innovation SARL. Handpresso is of Danish design and has created and patented the world's first handheld espresso maker, Handpresso WILD ESE, which is sold in 25 countries. The first Handpresso machines were designed for E.S.E. coffee pods.

In the year 2008, Handpresso won 7 international design prizes including IF and Formland.

In 2012, the company launched the Handpresso Auto, an espresso machine for the car.

In 2013, the Handpresso Wild Hybrid was awarded the National Geographic's Gear of the Year.

Technology

The Handpresso Wild works by pumping the Handpresso unit up to 16 bar pressure. Hot water is then added from a kettle or a thermo flask to the 50 ml reservoir, and an E.S.E. pod or Domepod (ground coffee) inserted before serving the coffee at the push of a button. The infusion is stopped by pushing the button back. During the infusion the pressure drops in from 11 to 8 bar pressure.

The temperature of the water is very important for the final result. When freshly boiled water from a kettle is used, the water temperature is about 203 °F (95 °C) when it gets in contact with the coffee. The water from a thermo flask is usually cooler, but temperatures down to 176 °F (80 °C) still gives an acceptable result with most coffees.

Handpresso has filed several international patents.

See also

References

External links
 

French brands
Espresso machines
Companies established in 2006